12 Years Promise is a 2014 South Korean television series starring Lee So-yeon, Namkoong Min, Lee Tae-im, Yoon So-hee, Lee Won-keun and Ryu Hyo-young. It aired on JTBC from March 22 to June 29, 2014, on Saturdays and Sundays at 20:45 (KST) for 26 episodes.

The native title is a pun, and can also mean Jang Guk Becomes Dal-rae: Reunion in 12 Years. The female protagonist's name, Jang Guk, means "clear soup with doenjang", and she later changes it to Dal-rae, meaning "azalea".

Synopsis
In 2002, on the night of Korea's momentous World Cup win, high school sweethearts Jang Guk (Lee So-yeon) and Yu Jun-su (Namkoong Min) sleep together and Jang Guk ends up pregnant. They are given permission to marry by Jun-su's father, but after a horrible accident, Jang Guk loses the baby. Their mothers who were against the relationship from the beginning, take advantage of the situation and split them up. Jang Guk then leaves Korea to live in the U.S. and changes her name to Jang Dal-lae. Twelve years later, they reunite and get entangled in each other's lives again. The only problem is that Yu Jun-su doesn't know it's her and Jang Guk doesn't want him to know.

Cast

Main
 Lee So-yeon as Jang Guk / Jang Dal-rae
 Yoon So-hee as young Jang Guk
Guk is a high school senior at the start of the story. She is a good student who has achieved the highest ranking in her classes. After losing her father in a tragic accident, she moves from Busan to Seoul with her mother and younger brother, Hoon. She meets and begins a relationship with her classmate Yu Jun-su and after a fateful night she ends up pregnant with his child.
 Namkoong Min as Yu Jun-su 
 Lee Won-keun as young Yu Jun-su
Jun-su is a high school senior at Daehan High School. He is handsome, friendly, and a good student. His father is the vice principal of the school. His family owns the building in which Jang Guk's family operates a dumpling restaurant. Over the course of twelve years, Jun-su goes from the son of a prominent wealthy household to struggling as the eldest provider for a family that scrapes by from paycheck to paycheck. Prideful and temperamental, he seems tough on the outside but is vulnerable underneath it all.
 Lee Tae-im as Ju Da-hae
 Ryu Hyo-young as young Ju Da-hae
Da-hae is an ace student who received the highest math score in all of Korea. She is humiliated when her father's adultery becomes public knowledge. Da-hae has been friends with Jun-su since childhood, and is in love with him. When Jun-su rejects Da-hae to date Guk, she is devastated.

Supporting

Jang Guk / Dal-rae's family
 Bae Jong-ok as Choi Go-soon
 Oh Seung-yoon as Jang Hoon
 Ra Yoon-chan as young Jang Hoon
 Seo Woo-rim as Yeo Il-sook
 Kim Young-ran as Yeo Sam-sook
 Um Hyo-sup as Jang Guk's father

Yu Jun-su's family
 Park Hae-mi as Pyung Beom-sook
 Chun Ho-jin as Yu Jeong-han
 Kim Si-hoo as Yu Jun-seong
 Choi Won-hong as young Yu Jun-seong
 Danny Ahn as Yu Su-han
 Jung Kyung-soon as Yu Jeong-suk

Ju Da-hae's family
 Ji Soo-won as Kim Yeong-hui
 Lee Han-wi as Joo Chul-soo
 Nhã Phương as Ha-mi
 Choi Ro-woon as Ju Hong

Extended
 Jung Chan as Heo Se-min
 Jung In-sun as Kang Ham-cho
 Lee Young-eun as young Kang Ham-cho
 Lee Yong-joo as Park Mu-cheol, childhood friend of Jun-su
 Han Min as young Park Mu-cheol
 Ah Young as Park Mu-hui
 Lee Do-yeon as young Park Mu-hui
 Shin Dong-mi as Yeo-ok
 Jung Kyu-soo as Mr. Kang

International broadcast

References

External links
  
 
 

JTBC television dramas
2014 South Korean television series debuts
2014 South Korean television series endings
2010s South Korean television series
Korean-language television shows